Charles Jean-Baptiste Fleuriau, comte de Morville (30 October 1686, in Paris – 2 February 1732) was a French statesman.

Son of Joseph Fleuriau d'Armenonville, he was ambassador to Holland, then Secretary of State for the Navy from 28 February 1722 to 16 August 1723.

When cardinal Dubois entered his death throes, the duke of Orléans sent Fleuriau de Morville to Versailles to lay hands on Dubois's papers and, in reward, named him Secretary of State for Foreign Affairs on 16 August 1723.  He remained in this post until 19 August 1727.

1686 births
1732 deaths
18th-century French people
17th-century French people
People of the Regency of Philippe d'Orléans
People of the Ancien Régime
Counts of France
Secretaries of State of the Navy (France)
Members of the Académie Française
Knights of the Golden Fleece of Spain